Montefalcone may refer to one of the following comuni in Italy:
Montefalcone Appennino, in the province of Ascoli Piceno
Montefalcone di Val Fortore, in the province of Benevento
Montefalcone nel Sannio, in the province of Campobasso

Montefalcone (it) is also the name of a natural reserve in the province of Pisa

See also
Monfalcone (disambiguation)